This is a list of monuments in Salyan District, Nepal as officially recognized by and available through the website of the Department of Archaeology, Nepal. Salyan is a district of Karnali Province and is located in midwestern Nepal.

List of monuments

|}

See also 
 List of monuments in Karnali Province
 List of monuments in Nepal

References 

Salyan
Salyan District, Nepal